Navajo Upper Antelope Canyon is a slot canyon in the American Southwest, on Navajo land east of Lechee, Arizona. It includes six separate, scenic slot canyon sections on the Navajo Reservation, referred to as Upper Antelope Canyon (or The Crack), Rattle Snake Canyon, Owl Canyon, Mountain Sheep Canyon, Canyon X and Lower Antelope Canyon (or The Corkscrew). It is the primary attraction of Lake Powell Navajo Tribal Park, along with a hiking trail to Rainbow Bridge National Monument.

Both are in the LeChee Chapter of the Navajo Nation. They are accessible by Navajo guided tour only.

Geology
Antelope Canyon was formed by the erosion of Navajo Sandstone due to flash flooding and other sub-aerial processes. Rainwater, especially during monsoon season, runs into the extensive basin above the slot canyon sections, picking up speed and sand as it rushes into the narrow passageways. Over time the passageways eroded away, deepening the corridors and smoothing hard edges to form characteristic "flowing" shapes.

Tourism and sightseeing
Antelope Canyon is a popular location for sightseers, and a source of tourism business for the Navajo Nation. It has been accessible by tour since 1983 by Pearl Begay Family and 1997, when the Navajo Tribe made it a Navajo Tribal Park. Besides the Upper and Lower areas, there are other slots in the canyon that can be visited, such as the Rattle Snake Canyon, Owl Canyon, Mountain Sheep Canyon which is also part of the same drainage as Antelope Canyon. 

Photography within the canyons is difficult due to the wide exposure range (often 10 EV or more) made by light reflecting off the canyon walls.

Upper Antelope Canyon

Upper Antelope Canyon is called , 'the place where water runs through rocks' by the Navajo People in that specific area. It is the most frequently visited by tourists because its entrance and entire length are at ground level, requiring no climbing; and because beams of direct sunlight radiating down from openings at the top of the canyon are much more common all year round that make the inside canyon very colorful. Beams occur most often in summer, as they require the sun to be high in the sky of mid day. Light beams start to peek into the canyon March 20 and disappear by October 20.

Lower Antelope Canyon

Lower Antelope Canyon, called , or 'spiral rock arches' by the Navajo, is located several miles from Upper Antelope Canyon. Prior to the installation of metal stairways, visiting the canyon required climbing pre-installed ladders in certain areas.

Even following the installation of stairways, it is a more difficult hike than Upper Antelope. It is longer, narrower in places, and even footing is not available in all areas. Five flights of stairs of varying widths are currently available to aid in descent and ascent. At the end, the climb out requires flights of stairs. Additionally, sand continually falls from the crack above and can make the stairs slippery.

Despite these limitations, Lower Antelope Canyon draws a considerable number of photographers, though casual sightseers are much less common than in the Upper canyon. Photography-only tours are available around midday when light is at its peak. Photographers cannot bring a tripod.

The lower canyon is in the shape of a "V" and shallower than the Upper Antelope. Lighting is better in the early hours and late morning.

Flash flooding 
Antelope Canyon is visited exclusively through guided tours, in part because rains during monsoon season can quickly flood it. Rain does not have to fall on or near the Antelope Canyon slots for flash floods to whip through; rain falling dozens of miles away can funnel into them with little notice.

On August 12, 1997, eleven tourists, including seven from France, one from the United Kingdom, one from Sweden and two from the United States, were killed in Lower Antelope Canyon by a flash flood. The lone survivor was tour guide Francisco "Pancho" Quintana, who had prior swift-water training. At the time, the ladder system consisted of amateur-built wood ladders that were swept away by the flood. Today, ladder systems have been bolted in place, and deployable cargo nets are installed at the top of the canyon. A NOAA Weather Radio from the National Weather Service and an alarm horn are on hand at the fee booth.

Despite improved warning and safety systems, the risks of injury from flash floods still exists. On July 30, 2010, several tourists were stranded on a ledge when two flash floods occurred at Upper Antelope Canyon. Some of them were rescued and some had to wait for the flood waters to recede. There were reports that a woman and her nine-year-old son were injured as they were washed away downstream, but no fatalities were reported.

References

External links

 Antelope Canyon – Lake Powell Navajo Tribal Park at Navajo Parks and Recreation Dept.
 Antelope Canyon Tours and information
 Upper Antelope Canyon Tours, Tickets, Permits
 Antelope Canyon – Flash Flood
 Slot Canyons of the American Southwest – Antelope Canyon

Canyons and gorges of Arizona
Landforms of Coconino County, Arizona
Slot canyons
Protected areas of Coconino County, Arizona
Geography of the Navajo Nation